Al Wadud (date of birth to be confirmed) is a Bangladeshi former first-class cricketer who played in three matches for Sylhet Division in the 2003–04 season. He has sometimes been referenced on scorecards by his nickname "Sweet". Al Wadud's batting and bowling styles are unconfirmed. He took seven first-class wickets at the average of 17.71 with a best performance of 3 for 37 against Rajshahi Division. He totalled 20 runs with a highest score of 11*.

References

Bangladeshi cricketers
Sylhet Division cricketers
Living people
Date of birth unknown
Year of birth missing (living people)